Archeobuprestis is a fossil genus of beetles in the family Buprestidae, containing the following species:

 Archeobuprestis maxima Walker, 1938
 Archeobuprestis minima Walker, 1938

References

Buprestidae genera
Prehistoric beetle genera